Ficus pulchella is a species of tree in the family Moraceae. It is native to South America.

Conservation
It is considered a vulnerable species by the IUCN, as it is threatened by habitat loss.

References

pulchella
Endemic flora of Brazil
Flora of the Atlantic Forest
Trees of Brazil
Flora of Pará
Flora of Paraná (state)
Flora of Rio de Janeiro (state)
Flora of Santa Catarina (state)
Taxonomy articles created by Polbot